The flag of Estonia is a tricolour featuring three equal horizontal bands of blue (top), black (middle), and white (bottom).

The tricolour was already in wide use as the symbol of Estonia and Estonians when the Republic of Estonia became a fully independent country in 1918. Formally, the  became the national flag by the decision of the Estonian Provisional Government on 21 November 1918, and the parliament later reconfirmed the flag's official status with a law in 1922. 

The tricolour was publicly used as the national flag until the first year of World War II when the Soviet Red Army invaded Estonia in June 1940. Following the occupation and annexation of Estonia by the USSR in August 1940, the new Stalinist regime banned the Estonian flag, and its use as well as any use of its blue, black and white colour combination became punishable by laws of the Soviet Union. The national flag was from 1940 until 1991 continuously used by the Estonian government-in-exile, diplomatic service, and the diaspora of Estonian refugees around the world. In October 1988, the usage of the blue-black-white flag was officially permitted again by the local authorities. On 23 February 1989, the Soviet flag was taken down permanently from the Pikk Hermann tower of the Toompea Castle in the capital city Tallinn. It was replaced with the blue-black-white flag on the next morning, 24 February, upon the 70th anniversary of the Estonian Declaration of Independence (1918). The national flag was officially re-adopted by the Estonian authorities 7 August 1990, one year before the nation's full restoration of independence.

Colours 
The shade of blue is defined by Parliament and Government Office as follows:
Pantone colour 285 C.
CMYK equivalents: C=91, M=43, Y=0, K=0
RGB values: R=0, G=114, B=206

Other current flags

Symbolism 
A symbolic interpretation made popular by the poetry of Martin Lipp says the blue is for the vaulted blue sky above the native land, the black for attachment to the soil of the homeland as well as the fate of Estonians — for centuries black with worries, and white for purity, hard work, and commitment.

History 
 

In the 1820s, in the University of Tartu, three eponymous German-speaking student corporations (corps) were established for each of the three Baltic provinces (Estonia, Livonia and Curonia). Each of them selected their own "colours" which, in turn, became flags and visual representations of the corresponding province. Public display (for example, as part of attire) of these colour combinations was often prohibited by the Imperial Russian authorities and, after the outbreak of World War I, finally and completely banned during the anti-German propaganda campaign in 1915.

In 1870, the predecessor of the Estonian Students' Society, the first Estonian-speaking student organisation, was established at the University of Tartu, and in 1881 it adopted a similar tricolour flag and set of three "colours": blue, black, and white. The selection of blue and white then was probably also motivated by the flag of Finns and, unlike the earlier corps' colour combinations, each one of the three colours of the new organisation was ascribed symbolic meanings.

The Estonian blue-black-white flag was therefore officially adopted first as a flag of a university student organisation on 17 September 1881 by the constituent assembly of the first Estonian-speaking student corps "Vironia" (modern Estonian Students' Society) in Tartu. The colours and the pattern chosen by the student society eventually became the national flag in the 20th century.

The tricolour flag became associated with Estonian nationalism and was already used as the national flag (riigilipp) when the Estonian Declaration of Independence was issued on 23–24 February 1918. Formally, the tricolour became the national flag by the decision of the Estonian Provisional Government on 21 November 1918. On 12 December 1918, the flag was for the first time raised on top of the Pikk Hermann tower, and that location has since then become its most symbolic site of display. The flag's official status was reconfirmed by a law passed by the Estonian parliament on 16 July 1922. 

The invasion of Estonia by the Soviet Army on 16–17 June 1940 was quickly followed by the flag being banned by the occupation authorities. It was taken down from the most symbolic location, the tower of Pikk Hermann in Tallinn, on 21 June 1940, when Estonia was still formally independent. On the next day, 22 June, it was hoisted along with the red flag. The tricolour disappeared completely from the tower on 27 July 1940, and was replaced by the red flag of the Soviet Union. 

During the German occupation from 1941 until 1944, the tricolour flag was accepted as the flag of the Estonian people but not as the country's national flag. After the German retreat from Tallinn in September 1944, the Estonian tricolour was hoisted once again.

When the Red Army conquered Tallinn on 22 September 1944, the blue-black-white flag disappeared from the Pikk Hermann tower. Its place was subsequently taken by the Soviet red flags until 1989. Any display or distribution of the blue-black-white flag remained a punishable crime by the Soviet laws which were enforced until the late 1980s. 21 October 1987 was the first time when Soviet forces did not take down the flag at a public event. Starting from 24 February 1989 the blue-black-white flag has been flown again from the Pikk Hermann tower in Tallinn. It was formally redeclared as the national flag on 7 August 1990, little over a year before Estonia restored full independence.

Historical flags used prior to the flag of Estonia

Nordic flag proposals 

Several Nordic cross designs were proposed already in 1919, prior to the official adoption of the Estonian state flag. In 2001, journalist Kaarel Tarand made a similar suggestion again – that the flag design be changed from a tricolour to a Nordic cross with the same three colours. Supporters of this idea have claimed that the cross, instead of a tricolour design, would better symbolise Estonia's links with Nordic countries. However, as the traditional tricolour bands have by now become an important symbol of national identity, proposals to modify the national flag have not gained much popularity.

Advocates for a Nordic flag state that Estonians consider themselves a Nordic nation rather than Baltic, based on their cultural and historical ties with Sweden, Denmark, and particularly Finland. In December 1999, the Estonian foreign minister—later the Estonian president from 2006 to 2016—Toomas Hendrik Ilves delivered a speech entitled "Estonia as a Nordic Country" to the Swedish Institute for International Affairs. Diplomat Eerik-Niiles Kross also suggested changing the country's official name in English and several other foreign languages from Estonia to Estland (which is the country's name in Danish, Dutch, German, Swedish, Norwegian and many other Germanic languages).

According to politician Paul Puustusmaa the Estonian cross flag symbolises the national culture and its roots. He said that this approach does not abandon any historical-social-cultural layering that formed the Estonian nationality, starting from vikings, involving the time of Livonian Confederation, and respecting the Baltic German cultural roots, which in turn pushed national awakening and the birth of independent Estonia.

Selections from the Estonian Flag Act 
The most recent Estonian Flag Act was passed 23 March 2005 and came into force on 1 January 2006. It has been amended several times since then. The Act specifies the colours in Pantone and CMYK formats, as well as specifying when it can be hoisted and how it can be used and by whom. The Act specifies that the "Estonian flag is used as the ethnic and the national flag". 

More specifically, the Flag Act specifies that the flag be hoisted on the Pikk Hermann tower in Tallinn every day at sunrise, but not earlier than 7:00 a.m., and is lowered at sunset. The flag flying days are:

 3 January: Commemoration Day of Combatants of the Estonian War of Independence
 2 February: Anniversary of Tartu Peace Treaty 
 24 February: Independence Day
 14 March: Mother Tongue Day
 23 April: Veterans' Day
 The second Sunday of May: Mothers' Day
 9 May: Europe Day
 1 June: Day for the Protection of Children
 4 June: Flag Day
 14 June: Day of Mourning
 23 June: Victory Day
 24 June: Midsummer Day
 20 August: Day of Restoration of Independence
 1 September: Day of Knowledge
 The second Sunday of September: Grandparents' Day
 The third Saturday of October: Finno-Ugric Day
 The second Sunday of November: Fathers' Day
 The day of election of the Riigikogu (parliament), the day of election of local councils, the day of a referendum and the day of election of the European Parliament.

Gallery

See also 

 Coat of arms of Estonia
 Flags of Estonian counties
 National symbols of Estonia

Notes

References

Citations

General and cited references 
 - Total pages: 409

External links

 
 Estonian Flag: History

 
Estonia
Estonia
Estonia
National symbols of Estonia